Blayney is a farming town and administrative centre with a population of 3,378 in 2016, in the Central West region of New South Wales, Australia.

History 
Prior to European settlement the area was occupied by the Aboriginal Wiradjuri and, or, Gundungara peoples.

The first European to travel through area was surveyor George Evans, in 1815 and unofficial occupation of the district began in 1821.  The first land grant in the general area known as Coombing Park was issued to Thomas Icely in 1829.

In 1836 the locality was known as King's Plains, with Doyle's inn being the only public-house.  There was also a mill worked by a man called Lambert.

In 1842 Governor Gipps proposed the creation of a village to be named 'Blayney'.  His proposed site, however, was about 9 km north-east of the present site in the Kings Plains area, but once that spot proved unsuitable the Blayney village location was established on its present site in 1843.

A train line used to run from Blayney to the Lime Kilns, transporting lime. This is situated on land adjoining the Blayney Cemetery and is heritage listed. Remnants of the lime kilns can still be seen today.

Heritage listings 
Blayney has a number of heritage-listed sites, including:
 Adelaide Street: Blayney Uniting Church
 Main Western railway: Blayney railway station

Facilities and services
Blayney has three hotels: The Exchange, the Royal, and Tattersalls, all in Adelaide Street. A fourth, the Club House, has been converted to a Baptist church. There are six churches in all, the other five being Catholic, Uniting, Anglican, Presbyterian and Pentecostal.

There are three service stations, one offering unmanned 24-hour service for credit card purchases, one supermarket (IGA/Discount Daves), and various retail shops. A multi-purpose Community Centre with a large auditorium and a commercial standard kitchen is adjacent to the Council Chambers, and council also operate an aquatic centre with a large indoor swimming pool and other exercise facilities, and a public library. There are State Government run primary and high schools, with pupils arriving by school bus from surrounding rural areas, and a Catholic run primary school. The hospital offers emergency and medical care and limited surgical services, with more serious cases being transferred to Orange Base Hospital.

There is a 24-hour public toilet in Adelaide Street (the Mid-Western Highway) just before leaving the town heading west.

Industry

The arrival of the railway in 1874 boosted development and Blayney replaced Carcoar as the major service centre to local farmlands.  Blayney then became a municipality in 1882 and by 1900 a butter factory and freezing works employed many within the town.  An abattoir opened in 1957 and this industry was later supplemented with tanneries and a pet food plant. The abattoirs closed in 1999.

In the late 1970s or early '80s a meat canning factory was built on farmland land East of Blayney. This produced Spam and other canned meats. This was later turned into an export meat boning facility run by Ron Jones Exports and then a pet food factory. Prior to this, the dam on the land was famous for yabbies, with Sunday school excursions frequenting there.

In 1989, Nestlé built a new pet food plant, Nestlé Purina, and purchased adjoining land including Blayney Foods. The Nestlé factory exports pet food to Asia and the Pacific.

The Cadia-Ridgeway Mine is a major employer in the area.

In 1994, Blayney became home to Australia's largest inland container terminal, which is situated beside the railway station.

The Blayney Wind Farm, launched in 2000, is the largest of its type in Australia. It consists of 15 wind turbine generators on elevated ridges between Carcoar Dam and Mount Macquarie. Capacity is 10 megawatts, sufficient energy to supply 3,500 Australian homes.

Climate

Due to its deep valley location, Blayney shows a greater diurnal range but narrower seasonal range throughout the year compared to nearby Millthorpe which is more exposed. Summers are warm and dry with severe thunderstorms; winters are cool and partly cloudy, with some occurrences of snowfall.

Transportation 
The town's railway station is served by the daily NSW TrainLink XPT service between Sydney and Dubbo and the weekly Outback Xplorer to Broken Hill, as well as several NSW TrainLink Coach and private company bus services connecting with Bathurst and Orange.

Notable citizens 
 Nathan Burns: professional football player with A-League club Wellington Phoenix and the Australian national team.
 Frank Cooper: Premier of Queensland from 1942 to 1946.
 Peter Toohey, Australian Test cricketer of the late 1970s

Gallery

References

Bibliography
 St. Paul's Church, Blayney, 1862-1937 : an historical sketch. Alan Dougan. [Blayney, N.S.W.? : Presbyterian Church of Australia, 1937]
 The Anglican Church of Australia, the Diocese of Bathurst : a history of the development of the Parish of Blayney, 1833-1991. [compiled and edited by J.T. Clarkson, C.H.R. Dent] Blayney, N.S.W. : Christ Church Anglican Church, 1991.  :
 The kings colonials. Garry Reynolds ; illustrated by Christine Reynolds. [Millthorpe, N.S.W. : G. Reynolds], 1982.  :
 Together travel on : commemorating 150 years of Christian worship, service and mission through the Blayney [Uniting] Church, 1843 to 1993 : Wesleyan Methodist (1843-1902), Methodist (1902-1977), Uniting (1977-1993)  Blayney, [N.S.W.] : Uniting Church in Australia, 1993.
 Dear Mother : a nominal roll of the men and women from Blayney and surrounding districts who served "Queen and country" in the South African (Boer) War 1899-1902. Blayney, N.S.W. : Blayney Shire Local & Family History Group Inc., 2002. 
 Notes on the geology of the Blayney area.  G.A.M. Henderson. [Canberra] : BMR Geology and Geophysics, Australia, c1991. 
 Blayney, list of interments : from Blayney Shire records and headstones found in cemetery. compiled by Helen Jeuken and Alan Nesbitt. Bathurst, N.S.W. : Bathurst Family History Research, 1989. 
 The Blayney advocate and Carcoar herald. Originally published weekly: Blayney, N.S.W. : John Mellor. National Library of Australia Microform
 Blayney Shire pioneer register St. Joseph's Central School Blayney. Blayney, N.S.W. : St Joseph's Central School, Blayney, P. & F. Association, [1993] 
 Blayney District Hospital, 1910-1960 : a brief history to commemorate its 50th anniversary. compiled [i.e. written] by A.A. Cheney [Blayney, N.S.W. : Blayney Newspaper Co., 1960]
 Blayney Public School : established 1858 [Sandra Retallack] Blayney, N.S.W., : Blayney Public School, 2008.

External links

 Biography of Thomas Icley at ADB online
 Blayney Wind Farm
 Blayney Shire Website
 Industries in the Blayney Shire
 Parish of St James The Great, Blayney
 Blayney High School
 Blayney Public School
 Large Gold Find Near Blayney
 Blayney Chronicle
 Blayney St Joseph's Catholic School
 History of Christ Church, Blayney
 Blayney Local Library
 Tourism info.
 Visit.NSW.com - Blayney

 
Towns in the Central West (New South Wales)
Blayney Shire
Lime kilns in Australia